Fred Barrett may refer to:

 Fred Barrett (jockey) (1867–1895), English horse racing jockey
 Fred Barrett (rugby league) (1920–2004), English rugby league player and coach
 Fred Barrett (ice hockey) (born 1950), Canadian retired ice hockey defenceman
 Fred Barrett (footballer) (1893–1968), English footballer
 Frederick Barrett (1883–1931), survivor of the sinking of RMS Titanic

See also
Fred Barratt (1894–1947), English cricketer
 Fred (name)
 Barrett (name)